Ab Nuk (also Romanized as Āb Nūk; also known as Ābnūk) is a village in Tayebi-ye Sarhadi-ye Gharbi Rural District, Charusa District, Kohgiluyeh County, Kohgiluyeh and Boyer-Ahmad Province, Iran. At the 2006 census, its population was 191, in 34 families.

References 

Populated places in Kohgiluyeh County